Carl Grady Ray (January 31, 1889 – April 2, 1970) was a Major League Baseball pitcher who played in  and  with the Philadelphia Athletics.

External links

1889 births
1970 deaths
Major League Baseball pitchers
Baseball players from North Carolina
Philadelphia Athletics players
Winston-Salem Twins players
Newport News Shipbuilders players
Greensboro Patriots players
Rocky Mount Tar Heels players
Portsmouth Truckers players
Nashua Millionaires players
Haverhill Hillies players
People from Stokes County, North Carolina